Aeromonas encheleia is a Gram-negative, motile bacterium of the genus Aeromonas isolated from European eels in Valencia, Spain.

References

External links
Type strain of Aeromonas encheleia at BacDive -  the Bacterial Diversity Metadatabase

Aeromonadales
Bacteria described in 1995